Shree Himalaya Higher Secondary School is public high school in Saurpani, Nepal.

It was established in 2017 B.S (1060 A. D.)  by local community and government of Nepal. At that time it was primary school, later it's became secondary and in 2065 B.S (2009 A.D) it's became high school..
School was restored after destroyed in 2036 earthquake and it's again destroyed in 2072 Gorkha earthquake .

Founders of school in 1960
Members who contribute to the need of education great era of unparalleled 

Founding Members
 Chaturman Shrestha, Founding Chairman, Saurpani Bazaar
 Krishna Lal Dhakal, Founding vice Chairman, Sundardada
 Dilliram Dhakal, Pokhari
 Bhagirath Dhakal, Pokhari
 Mitralal Dhakal, Pokhari
 Kul Bahadur Shrestha, Saurpani Bazaar
 Baburam Sapkota, Saurpani Bazaar
 Ramprasad Paneru, Dadagaun
 Dhanbahadur Gurung, Ritthabot
 Kale Gurung, Ritthabot
 Balbahadur Khabas, Arubote
 Lalbahadur Shrestha, Saurpani Bazaar
 Chetnarayan Shrestha, Founding Secretary Member, Saurpani Bazaar 
 Durgabhakta Sharma Dahal Headmaster, Majinthok, Gorkha

External links
Information about Gorkha
Radio Saurpani
Glopoi Travel Destination

Educational institutions established in 1960
Secondary schools in Nepal
1960 establishments in Nepal